The County of Bourke is one of the 37 counties of Victoria which are part of the Lands administrative divisions of Australia, (used for land titles and no longer other administrative or political function). It is the oldest and most populous county in Victoria and contains the city of Melbourne. Like other counties in Victoria, it is subdivided into parishes. The county was named after Irish born Sir Richard Bourke, the Governor of New South Wales between 1831 and 1837. It is bordered by the Werribee River in the west; the Great Dividing Range in the north; Port Phillip in the south; and by Dandenong Creek, a small part of the Yarra River, and the Plenty River in the east. The county was proclaimed in 1853.

The "Melbourne and County of Bourke Police" was the name for the police force in the area before 1853. The County of Bourke was used on the name of the electoral roll in 1845. There was also the "Bourke County Court" in the 1850s, which became the County Court of Victoria. Melbourne is also referenced as being in "Bourke county" in the Encyclopædia Britannica Eleventh Edition.

Parishes

Following is a list of parishes within the County of Bourke. Many of the links below link to a modern suburb or town, which is situated within the parish. In most cases, the parish itself is much bigger than the modern suburb or town.

Several of the parishes are also part of a neighbouring county. For example, Bylands, Forbes, Goldie, Lancefield and Newham parishes are located in the County of Bourke as well as the County of Dalhousie. Morang, Toorourrong and Yan Yean parishes are in the County of Bourke as well as the County of Evelyn. Finally, Ballan parish is situated within both the County of Bourke and the County of Grant.

See also
 Local government areas of Victoria

References
Vicnames, place name details
Research aids, Victoria 1910

External links
Plans of the County of Bourke 1835-1855

Counties of Victoria (Australia)
Geography of Melbourne